Tlazazalca is a small town in the northern region of Michoacan, Mexico in an area first settled by ancient Nahuatl tribes in the early 14th Century.

Overview
The town was officially established in 1545 by the Franciscan priest John of Saint Michael (Spanish: Juan de San Miguel) who accompanied the army of Nuño de Guzman during the conquest of the region. Subsequently, Franciscan priests proceeded to baptize the Native Purepecha and Chichimeca populations that inhabited the area. In addition to the city center, the Spanish Conquistadors also established within the jurisdiction of Tlazazalca an "Indian Republic" (Spanish: Republica de Indios) whose role was to govern directly the Native populations subjected to Spanish authority. 

The town and surrounding areas were administered by the Parish of Saint Mark the Archangel (Parroquia de San Miguel Arcángel) whose name was chosen in honor of the town's Franciscan founder. Tlazazalca served as a major governing center in Michoacan until it was later subordinated to Zamora and Valladolid (Morelia).

List of mayors 
Mayo-Agosto 1904: Jesus Magaña y Bravo
Mayo-Agosto 1908: Jesus Magaña y Bravo
Septiembre 1909-Septiembre 1910: Jesus Magaña y Bravo
1940: José Zamora Gil 
1941: J. Salud Díaz Navarro  
1942: J. Jesús Martínez
J. Jesús Aguilar Gil  
José Chávez Chávez
1944: Fidel Magaña
1945: José Orozco Enríquez
Roberto Canchú Parocua
1946: Joaquín Anaya Rocha
1947: José Rodríguez Espinoza
1948: Carlos Meza García
1949: J. Jesús Fernández García
Alberto Fernández Torres
1950: Pilar Peña Orozco 
Jesús Magaña
Gabriel Magaña
Ignacio Chávez
José Rodríguez Espinoza
Crispin Vaca
Antonio Cortés
Cornelio Andrade
Eraclio Luna  
Leobardo Chávez
Octavio Magaña
Indalecio Magaña
Rosendo Magaña
Sabad Vaca
Ladislao Méndez 
Luis Fernández 
1955: Salud Días Navarro
Rubén Castillo Morales
José María Marrón
José Rodríguez Espinoza  
1960: Enrique Cortés Mújica
1961: Salvador Madrigal Chávez
1963: Emilio García Gámez  
Francisco Paz
1966: Luis Vaca Ramírez
1969-1971: Miguel Parocua Paz 
1972-1974: Luis Canchú Martínez 
1975-1977: Miguel Calderón Martínez
1978-1980: Gonzalo Verduzco Gil
1981-1983: Luis Andrade Chávez 
1984-1986: Gonzalo Verduzco Gil
1987-1989: Luis Andrade Chávez
1990-1992: Agustín Rubio Vieyra
1993-1995: Adolfo González Ayala 
1996-1998: José Cachú Aguilar 
1999-2001: Gonzalo Pérez Sepúlveda
2002-2004: Heliodoro Rodríguez Perales
2005-2007: Gildardo García Luna
2007-2008: Jose Cachu Aguilar
2015: Javíer Andrade Mata

References

External links 
[http://www.tlazazalca.com Tlazazazalca.com

Populated places in Michoacán